Mahmed Aghaev (born 26 May 1976) is a retired Russian-born Freestyle wrestler of Chechen descent. He switched to the Armenian national wrestling team in 1999. Aghaev began wrestling in 1987 and was part of the Ajastam Armenia club in Vanadzor. He won a silver medal at the 2003 European Wrestling Championships in Riga and competed at the 2004 Summer Olympics in Athens.

References

External links
 

1976 births
Living people
Armenian male sport wrestlers
Russian male sport wrestlers
Wrestlers at the 2004 Summer Olympics
Olympic wrestlers of Armenia
Chechen martial artists
Chechen sportsmen
European Wrestling Championships medalists
Russian emigrants to Armenia